Podlewski (feminine: Podlewska) is a Polish language surname. Notable people with the surname include: 

Henryk Podlewski (1920–2015), Polish doctor

Polish-language surnames